Wołcza may refer to the following places in Poland:

Wołcza (river)
Wołcza Mała
Wołcza Wielka